The shovel-snouted lizard (Meroles anchietae), also known commonly as Anchieta's desert lizard, Anchieta's dune lizard and the Namib sand-diver, is a species of lizard in the family Lacertidae. The species is native to southern Africa.

Etymology
The specific name, anchietae, is in honor of Portuguese naturalist José Alberto de Oliveira Anchieta, who was an explorer of Africa.

Geographic range
M. anchietae is found in Angola and Namibia.

Habitat

Description

Diet
M. anchietae preys upon insects, especially small beetles. During dry periods when insects are scarce, it will eat seeds.

Reproduction
M. anchietae is oviparous.

References

Further reading
Arnold EN (1989). "Towards a phylogeny and biogeography of the Lacertidae: relationships within an Old-World family of lizards derived from morphology". Bulletin of the British Museum (Natural History), Zoology 55 (2): 209–257. (Meroles anchietae, new combination).
Bocage JVB (1867). "Descriptions of two new Saurians from Mossamedes (West Africa)". Annals and Magazine of Natural History, Third Series 20: 225–228. (Pachyrhynchus anchietæ, new species, pp. 227–228, Figures 1–2).
Loveridge A (1936). "African Reptiles and Amphibians in the Field Museum of Natural History". Zoological Series, Field Museum of Natural History 22 (1): 1–122. (Aporosaura anchietae, p. 63).

Reptiles described in 1867
Meroles
Taxa named by José Vicente Barbosa du Bocage